Alfredo Accorsi (2 February 1881 – 5 October 1951) was an Italian gymnast who competed in the 1908 Summer Olympics.

References

External links
 

1881 births
1951 deaths
Gymnasts at the 1908 Summer Olympics
Italian male artistic gymnasts
Olympic gymnasts of Italy
Sportspeople from Ferrara